Carson City Cyclone is a 1943 American Western film directed by Howard Bretherton and written by Norman S. Hall and Robert Creighton Williams. The film stars Don "Red" Barry, Lynn Merrick, Noah Beery Sr., Bryant Washburn, Emmett Lynn and Stuart Hamblen. The film was released on March 3, 1943, by Republic Pictures.

Plot

Cast 
Don "Red" Barry as Gilbert Phalen
Lynn Merrick as Linda Wade
Noah Beery Sr. as Judge Phalen
Bryant Washburn as Doctor Andrews
Emmett Lynn as Tombstone Boggs 
Stuart Hamblen as Frank Garrett
Roy Barcroft as Joe Newman
Bud Osborne as Sheriff Wells
Jack Kirk as Henchman Dave
Bud Geary as Henchman Walker
Curley Dresden as Henchman Tom Barton

References

External links
 

1943 films
American Western (genre) films
1943 Western (genre) films
Republic Pictures films
Films directed by Howard Bretherton
American black-and-white films
1940s English-language films
1940s American films